Pfitzinger is a German surname that may refer to 
Christine Pfitzinger (born 1959), New Zealand middle-distance runner
Pete Pfitzinger (born 1957), American long-distance runner and exercise physiologist
Wilhelm Pfitzinger, German chemist known for the Pfitzinger reaction

German-language surnames